The Mount Graham National Forest, named after Mount Graham in Graham County, Arizona, was established as the Mount Graham Forest Reserve by the General Land Office on July 22, 1902, with .  After the transfer of federal forests to the U.S. Forest Service in 1905, it became a national forest on March 4, 1907. On July 1, 1908, part of Mount Graham National Forest was combined with Crook National Forest and the remainder was returned to the public domain.  The name was discontinued.

References

External links

 Forest History Society
 Listing of the National Forests of the United States and Their Dates (from the Forest History Society website) Text from Davis, Richard C., ed. Encyclopedia of American Forest and Conservation History. New York: Macmillan Publishing Company for the Forest History Society, 1983. Vol. II, pp. 743–88.
  – 

Former National Forests of Arizona